Jean-Baptiste Henri Durand-Brager (1814–1879) was a French painter, noted for his marine scenes and Orientalist works.

Life and career

Jean-Baptiste Henri Durand-Brager, a French marine painter, was born at Dol in Brittany in 1814. He studied under Gudin and Eugène Isabey.

He was a naval officer who rose to the rank of captain. In 1840, he accompanied the fleet which repatriated Napoleon's remains from St. Helena, which island afforded him subjects for various pictures. He spent much of his time in travelling; he went to Buenos Aires with the squadron, Montevideo in 1841–42 aboard a French warship, and explored Uruguay and Brazil; he accompanied the expeditions to Tangiers and Mogador, and to Madagascar. He painted views of the places he visited, and also naval combats and sea-pieces. He died in 1879.

In the 1850s, he was in the Crimea during the war with Russia, where he turned his hand to photography as well as painting. He was one of about fifteen photographers, including Felice Beato, Roger Fenton and James Robertson, who photographed soldiers, barracks, camp life and battlefields and were the first to record a major war on film. Later, he returned to Constantinople where he made photographs of the landscape, monuments and the people.

He was a versatile painter, producing naval scenes, genre works, costumbrismo works, landscapes and works with Orientalist themes. There are several of his works in the galleries of Versailles.

See also
 List of Orientalist artists
 List of artistic works with Orientalist influences

References

External links

 
 

1814 births
1879 deaths
19th-century French painters
French male painters
French marine artists
Orientalist painters
People from Ille-et-Vilaine
19th-century French male artists